Đức Huệ is a rural district of Long An province in the Mekong Delta region of Vietnam.  It has a western border with Cambodia; a southwest border with Thạnh Hóa district; an eastern border with Đức Hòa district; and a south and southeast border with Thủ Thừa district and Bến Lức district. As of 2003 the district had a population of 61,620. The district covers an area of 428 km². The district capital lies at Đông Thành.

Đức Huệ district was established under Decree No. 48-NV of the Republic of Vietnam on March 3, 1959.

Divisions
The district is divided into 10 communes:

Mỹ Thạnh Đông, Mỹ Quý Đông, Mỹ Quý Tây, Mỹ Thạnh Tây, Bình Thành, Mỹ Thạnh Bắc, Bình Hoà Bắc, Bình Hoà Nam, Bình Hoà Hưng and Mỹ Bình.

References

Districts of Long An province